Walking Down Broadway is a 1938 American film drama made by Twentieth Century-Fox Film Corporation and directed by Norman Foster.

Plot
A quintet of New York City chorus girls plan a reunion for the one-year anniversary of their show's closing. They discover the different paths their careers and lives have taken.

Partial cast
 Claire Trevor as Joan Bradley
 Phyllis Brooks as Vicki Stone
 Leah Ray as Linda Martin
 Dixie Dunbar as Tiny Brunson
 Lynn Bari as Sandra DeVoe
 Jayne Regan as Jerry Lane  
 Michael Whalen Peter Claybourne  
 Paul Fix as Man in Baccarat Club Bar

External links
 Walking Down Broadway at IMDB

1938 films
American drama films
1938 drama films
American black-and-white films
20th Century Fox films
1930s American films